Baharestan (also Romanized as Bahārestān and Baḩrestān; also known as Bahiristān and Khārestān) is a village in Heyran Rural District, in the Central District of Astara County, Gilan Province, Iran. At the 2006 census, its population was 82, in 15 families.

References 

Populated places in Astara County